Richard Tyler (May 7, 1928 – October 24, 1990) was an American sound engineer. He has been nominated for four Academy Awards in the category Best Sound. He worked on more than 60 films between 1971 and 1989.

Selected filmography
 Bite the Bullet (1975)
 Silver Streak (1976)
 Sorcerer (1977)
 Pennies from Heaven (1981)

References

External links

1990 deaths
American audio engineers
1928 births
20th-century American engineers